Abraham Ellis may refer to:

 Abe Ellis, a Stargate Atlantis character
 Abraham George Ellis (1846–1916), Dutch admiral and politician